Mariana Aydar is a Brazilian singer of MPB (Brazilian popular music).

Biography 
She was born in São Paulo in 1980 in a family of musicians. Her father, Mário Manga, was a member of the group Premê, and her mother Bia Aydar, was the producer of several Brazilian artists, including Lulu Santos and Luiz Gonzaga. Mariana Aydar spent nine months in Paris in 2004, in order to study music, and met the Brazilian singer Seu Jorge there. She would later sing in the opening acts of Seu Jorge's tour in Europe, in 2015.
She is married to multi-instrumentist band player Duani, who is also her producer.

She has been dubbed as the "hottest singer of the moment" by the weekly Veja, one of the main Brazilian newsmagazines.

Discography

Albums
 2006 - Kavita 1
 2009 - Peixes, Pássaros e Pessoa
 2011 - Cavaleiro Selvagem Aqui Te Sigo
 2015 - Pedaço Duma Asa
 2019 - Veia Nordestina
 2021 - Aqui em Casa, Vol. 1

Singles

References

1980 births
Living people
Música Popular Brasileira singers
Singers from São Paulo
21st-century Brazilian singers
21st-century Brazilian women singers
Latin Grammy Award winners